In organic chemistry, the Malaprade reaction or Malaprade oxidation is a glycol cleavage reaction in which a vicinal diol is oxidized by periodic acid or a periodate salt to give the corresponding carbonyl functional groups.

References

See also 
 Criegee oxidation

Organic oxidation reactions
Name reactions